Fumaça (Portuguese, 'smoke') may refer to:

Brazilian footballers
Fumaça (footballer, born 1976) (José Rodrigues Alves Antunes)
Fumaça (footballer, born 1985) (Alessandro Pedro Ribeiro)
Fumaça (footballer, born 1987) (Jonatha Alves da Silva)
Rodrigo Fumaça (born 1995)
Diego Fumaça (born 1994)

Other uses
Fumaça River, in Tocantins state, Brazil

See also

Smoke
Maria Fumaça, a 1977 album by Banda Black Rio
Morro da Fumaça, a Brazilian municipality in the state of Santa Catarina